The ring of the Nibelungs may refer to different things.

In literature and music:
 Der Ring des Nibelungen, (The Ring of the Nibelung or The Nibelung's Ring,) a group of epic operas by Richard Wagner.

In films and entertainment:
 Dark Kingdom: The Dragon King, also titled Ring of the Nibelungs, Die Nibelungen, Curse of the Ring, and Sword of Xanten, a fantasy film directed by Uli Eden.

See also
 Nibelungenlied